Aulicus is a genus of checkered beetles in the family Cleridae. There are about 14 described species in Aulicus.

Species
These 14 species belong to the genus Aulicus:

 Aulicus antennatus Schaeffer, 1921
 Aulicus apachei
 Aulicus bicinctus Linsley, 1936
 Aulicus dentipes Schaeffer, 1921
 Aulicus edwardsi (Horn, 1880)
 Aulicus edwardsii
 Aulicus femoralis Schaeffer, 1917
 Aulicus fissipes Schaeffer, 1921
 Aulicus humeralis Linsley, 1936
 Aulicus monticola Gorham, 1882
 Aulicus nero Spinola, 1844
 Aulicus nigriventris Schaeffer, 1921
 Aulicus reichei (Spinola, 1844)
 Aulicus terrestris Linsley, 1933

References

Further reading

 

Clerinae
Articles created by Qbugbot